Cary Stansbury (born October 17, 1958) is a former professional tennis player from the United States.

Biography
Stansbury grew up in the San Francisco Bay Area and played college tennis at UC Berkeley, earning ITA All-American honors in 1978.

Soon after turning professional he qualified for the main draw of the 1978 Australian Open and was beaten in the first round by four-time winner and seventh seed Ken Rosewall.

His best performance on the Grand Prix circuit came at the 1986 Sydney Indoor tournament, where he beat Peter McNamara en route to an appearance in the quarter-finals.

References

External links
 
 

1958 births
Living people
American male tennis players
California Golden Bears men's tennis players
Tennis players from San Francisco